Karimbam is a suburb of Taliparamba town in Kannur district in the Indian state of Kerala. It stretches from Government Hospital Karimbam to Panakkad and Varadool villages.

Administration
Karimbam is part of both Kurumathur Grama Panchayat and Taliparamba Municipality.

Biodiversity
The Karimbam farm is located near to Velipara and has been subjected to many academic studies. Botanists from different parts of the world have studied the biodiversity of Karimbam farm.  The district local body has published a handbook on the flora of Karimbam with photographs of 111 species. Noted environmentalist Dr.K.M.khaleel Chovva and botanist P.Sujanapal have authored the book.  South African scientist Sir Charles Alfred Barber stayed at Karimbam as part of his assignment to make a comprehensive study of plants for the preparation of a kind of registry titled `Flora of the Madras Presidency'

Tourism
The undulating hills that surround this little village make it exceptionally beautiful. The surrounding villages of Panakkad, Varadool and Muyyam are filled with lush green fields.

Kerala government has proposed to develop Karimbam farm to be a tourist hotspot in the state.

Major organizations
 Sir Syed College (Taliparamba)
 District Agricultural Farm, Taliparamba
 Keyi Sahib Training College
 Sir Syed Institute of Technology
 Government hospital
 KILA Centre for Organic Farming & Waste Management(Old ETC)

Transportation
The national highway passes through Taliparamba town. Goa and Mumbai can be accessed on the northern side and Cochin and Thiruvananthapuram can be accessed on the southern side.  Taliparamba has a good bus station and buses are easily available to all parts of Kannur district.  The road to the east of Iritty connects to Mysore and Bangalore.  But buses to these cities are available only from Kannur, 22 km to the south. The nearest railway stations are Kannapuram  and Kannur on Mangalore-Palakkad line. 
Trains are available to almost all parts of India subject to advance booking over the internet.  There are airports at Kannur, Mangalore and Calicut. All of them are small international airports with direct flights available only to Middle Eastern countries.

Image gallery

See also
Muyyam
 Taliparamba
 Alakkode Road
 Taliparamba West
 Dharmasala,Kannur
 Cheppanool

References 

Villages near Taliparamba